The Cusco Declaration, formally titled Preamble to the Foundation Act of the South American Union, is a two-page declaration of intent signed by 12 South American countries during the Third South American Summit on 8 December 2004 in Cusco, Peru. It announces the foundation of the Union of South American Nations. It called for a regional parliament, a common market and a common currency.

See also
 Constitutive Treaty

External links
 Text of the declaration (In English)
 Text of the declaration (In Spanish)

Union of South American Nations
Treaties concluded in 2004
Treaties of Argentina
Treaties of Bolivia
Treaties of Brazil
Treaties of Colombia
Treaties of Ecuador
Treaties of Guyana
Treaties of Chile
Treaties of Paraguay
Treaties of Peru
Treaties of Suriname
Treaties of Uruguay
Treaties of Venezuela